Conny Van Dyke, sometimes credited as Connie Van Dyke, is an American singer and actress.

Van Dyke was born in Cape Charles, Virginia, to Benjamin and Charlotte Elizabeth Van Dyke.

When she was 15 years old, Van Dyke made recordings, worked as a fashion model, and made her first film, Among the Thorns.

She worked as a songwriter and recording artist for Wheelsville Records in Detroit, Michigan.
She entered and won Teen magazines Miss Teen of the United States (unrelated to the current Miss Teen USA pageant) in 1960 and signed with Motown Records in 1961, making her one of the first white recording artists for the label. Her only Motown release appeared in early 1963, featuring "Oh Freddy", written by Smokey Robinson, backed with "It Hurt Me Too", written and previously recorded by Marvin Gaye.

She was cast in Hell's Angels '69 with Tom Stern, Jeremy Slate, and several members of the Hells Angels motorcycle club. Her only sibling, Benjamin Van Dyke III, was killed in an auto accident near Salinas, California in 1969. Shortly after Hell's Angels '69 she married Robert Page and gave birth to a son, Bronson. She continued to pursue recording, and released a self-titled album in 1972. She co-starred in W.W. and the Dixie Dancekings in 1975 with Burt Reynolds. Another album, Conny Van Dyke Sings for You, followed the film.

In 1975 she co-starred in Framed with Joe Don Baker, and in 2004 she co-starred in Shiner.  Van Dyke appeared on Adam-12, Nakia, and Police Woman, and on several game shows in the 1970s, including Match Game, You Don't Say, The Cross-Wits, The Hollywood Squares, Tattletales, and The Gong Show. In 2008 she made a return to network television, guest-starring on Cold Case, and appearing on CSI the following year.

Van Dyke supported United Cerebral Palsy's telethons for over 25 years.

References

External links
 

Living people
People from Nassawadox, Virginia
Actresses from Virginia
Singers from Virginia
20th-century American singers
20th-century American women singers
20th-century American actresses
21st-century American actresses
Year of birth missing (living people)